John Grant (died c.1744) was Archdeacon of Barnstaple from 1731 to 1744.

References

Archdeacons of Barnstaple
18th-century English people